James Herndon may refer to:

James Herndon (writer) (1926–1990), American writer and educator
James Herndon (drag queen) (1892–1983), American drag queen
Jimmy Herndon (born 1973), American football player
J. Marvin Herndon (born 1944), American scientist and conspiracy theorist